Get Ace is an animated television series that follows the adventures of Ace McDougal, a young boy with amazing hi-tech super powered dental braces. The series officially premiered on Eleven, on 19 January 2014, where it took first place in rating amongst animated programs.

Overview
A case of mistaken identity causes ordinary high school student, Ace McDougal, to be thrown into the fast-paced world of hi-tech super spies. During a normal trip to the dentist's office, Ace is accidentally fitted out with a set of hi-tech, super spy braces, loaded with dozens of different gadgets and a holographic artificial intelligence program named Hugo, that only he can see. Against the odds, Ace and Hugo (Holographic User Guidance Operative) must learn to get along in order to keep the braces secret and safe. The braces original owner Ned Krinkle, an evil spy and master of disguise, will do anything to get them back.

Since then Ned and his equally evil mother Hilda, have been trying to kidnap Ace and reclaim the braces for themselves. Ace spends his days trying to live a normal life, while constantly on the lookout for Ned and Hilda's next insane scheme to steal the braces from right out of his mouth! Episodes usually revolve around Ace using the braces to make his life easier and having it backfire on him, as well as Ned and Hilda's increasingly complicated schemes to capture Ace.

Characters

Ace McDougal (voiced by David Myles Brown) Ace is a nerdy 13-year-old, with a somewhat unfounded amount of confidence. Ace embraces chaos and confusion with unshakeable optimism and gusto. Always needing to stand out, Ace is quick to act and slow to think, often getting himself in trouble before Ned and Hilda even act. 
Hugo (voiced by Lyall Brooks) H.U.G.O, or Holographic User Guidance Operative, is the stuffy computer generated hologram that operates Ace's braces. Hugo's image is in the form of a younger Ned, but while Ned is a dim-witted buffoon, Hugo is quick-witted super intelligent genius. Hugo has been programmed with a very distinct human personality: He's fussy, superior with sophisticated tastes and a sharp sarcastic wit, making him and Ace an awkward team.
Ned Krinkle (voiced by Lyall Brooks) Ned is an evil spy and master of disguise. He is able to perfectly imitate absolutely anyone's looks and voice. The only way to identify Ned is by his tell-tale jagged teeth, the one part of his looks he can never seem to change, and which Ace must always be on the look-out for. Ned is childish and cowardly, often throwing tantrums or sobbing when things don't go his way.
Hilda Krinkle (voiced by Amanda Harrison) Hilda is a brilliant villain with decades of experience as a spy. Although she may have peaked during the Cold War, she's still fit, athletic and nimble as a ninja. Hilda is blindly devoted to her son Ned, often babying him as if he were a small child. She is very much the brains of the operation, and although she is willing to do anything to get the braces for her son, she will more often than not put Ned in dangerous situations to do it.

Episodes

Production and broadcast
In the past, reruns of the show aired on Eleven. The series has also aired on ABC3 as of 3 November 2014. On 9 February 2015 it was announced that, due to its popularity with viewers, a second season was greenlit, but never eventuated.

On 14 July 2015, the series was picked up by Hulu in the United States for streaming. It is currently available on Tubi.

From 8 September 2015, the show has aired on Canada's Teletoon.

The show aired in Portugal in 2015/2016 with the voices of: Tiago Caetano (Ace); Telmo Miranda (Ned, Hugo, Duffy, Tina's Father); Nelson Raposo (Prof. Pringle, Mr. Walker, Safari Bob, Mr. McDugal, Gordon, Athol, Anoop, etc.); Paula Pais (Ned's Mother, etc.) and Ana Gonçalves (Becky, Tina, etc.)
In India, this show aired on Marvel HQ.

Awards and nominations

Award wins

2014 AWGIE Award for Best Animation

2014 Screen Music Awards - Best Music For Children's Television Series

Nominations

2015 International Emmy Awards - Best Kids Animation

2015 Apollo Awards - Best 2D Animation

2015 Cartoons on the Bay - Pulcinella Awards - Best TV Series for Kids

2015 Cartoons on the Bay - Official Selection - TV Series for Kids

2015 AACTA Awards - Best Children's Television Series

2014 Screen Music Awards - Best Music For Children's Television Series

2014 AWGIE Award for Best Animation

References

External links 
 

2010s Australian animated television series
2010s high school television series
2014 Australian television series debuts
2014 Australian television series endings
Australian children's animated television series
Australian children's animated adventure television series
Australian children's animated comic science fiction television series
Australian high school television series
APRA Award winners
English-language television shows
Teen animated television series
10 Peach original programming
Teletoon original programming
Television series about revenge